Vena II (alternatively known as Vena: Chapter 2) is the third maxi-single by Japanese rock band Coldrain, released on 17 August 2016.

Originally intended to have the two new songs, along with the acoustic renditions of "Gone" and "The Story" to be included on a deluxe edition of Vena. Vena II would later be released as a maxi-single, with physical copies being exclusively released in Japan after complications and difficulties with their international label Hopeless Records.

Track listing
All lyrics written by Masato Hayakawa, all music composed by Masato Hayakawa and Ryo Yokochi.

CD

Limited edition DVD (Vena Japan Tour Live in Tokyo)

Personnel
  – lead vocals, acoustic guitar 
  – lead guitar, programming
  – rhythm guitar, backing vocals
  – bass guitar, backing vocals
  – drums

Charts

Single

References 

Coldrain songs
2016 singles
2016 songs
Songs written by Masato Hayakawa